Events in the year 1976 in Bolivia.

Incumbents
President: Hugo Banzer

Events
1976 Bolivian census
July 17-August 1 - Bolivia participates in the 1976 Summer Olympics in Montreal, Quebec, Canada
dissolution of Mariscal Santa Cruz

Births

Deaths
June 2 - Juan José Torres, former President, in Argentina

See also
Bolivia at the 1976 Summer Olympics

 
1970s in Bolivia